Trent Ashford Gamble (born July 24, 1977 in Denver, Colorado) is a former American football safety who played in the National Football League. He was signed by the Miami Dolphins as an undrafted free agent in 2000. He played college football at Wyoming and high school football at Ponderosa High School in Parker, Colorado.

1977 births
Living people
American football safeties
Wyoming Cowboys football players
Miami Dolphins players
Players of American football from Denver